Qods may refer to:

Geography
 Jerusalem, a disputed city in the Levant, sometimes known as Qods from Al-Quds, the Arabic name
 Qaleh-ye Qods, a village in Markazi Province, Iran
 Qods, Iran, a city in Tehran Province, Iran
 Qods, Semnan, a village in Semnan Province, Iran
 Shahrak-e Gharb, a suburb of Tehran, Iran, known as Qods or Shahrak-e Qods (little city of Qods)
 Shahrak-e Qods, Mahshahr, a village in Khuzestan Province, Iran

Organizations
 Qods Aviation Industry Company
 Neshan-e Aqdas, Imperial Iranian Order founded in 1870
 Quds Force, a special forces unit of Iran's Revolutionary Guards

Recreation
 Qods League, Iranian football (soccer) league

See also
 Al-Quds (disambiguation)
 Questions on Doctrine, or QODs
 Shahrak-e Qods (disambiguation)